2015 ENEOS 1000 kilometru lenktynes (ENEOS 1000 km race) was a 16th running of ENEOS 1000 kilometrų lenktynės, a touring car and GT endurance racing event held in Lithuania, at Palanga circuit , 2 kilometers away from resort town Palanga on July 16–18, 2015.

Race was won by Jonas Gelžinis, Ignas Gelžinis and Tautvydas Barštys who drove for Juta-KG Group team. Nerijus Dagilis, Nemunas Dagilis and Robertas Kupčikas finished second for Balpol-15 min powered by Oktanas Racing and Steve Vanbellingen, Erik Qvick, Dirk Vanrompuy and Tom Vanrompuy took final podium position for Belgian Qvick Motors team.

Background

For the first practice session, all teams were divided into two groups. 2013 ENEOS 1000 kilometrų lenktynės winners General Financing-Autopaslauga by Pitlane confirmed their favourite status, as Jeroen Bleekemolen went fastest in first practice session with a laptime of 1:12.796. Juta-KG Group and MOPTRANS-Club PORT by JR Motorsport also impressed with their speed, as they completed top three.

Algirdai Racing Team with Aquila CR1 was fastest in other group, but slower than Porsche of General Financing-Autopaslauga by Pitlane. Ramūnas Čapkauskas of Algirdai Racing Team damaged his car in the first practice session, but the team managed to repair it before the start of second practice session, where he showed best lap time of 1:12.920

"Blue Ghost Racing Team" driver Modestas Jakas crashed his Toyota Celica heavily in the second practice session. Luckily, he wasn't injured, but his team was forced to withdraw from the race.

Qualifying

Jeroen Bleekemolen, who drove for General Financing - Autopaslauga by Pitlane, qualified on pole with best lap time of 1:09.679. Jonas Gelžinis from Juta Racing was second, less than half a second behind Jeroen Bleekemolen (Lap time 1:10.090). Algirdai Racing Team's Ramūnas Čapkauskas took third position, driving Aquila CR1 prototype (Lap Time 1:10.156).

Qualifying was red-flagged several times. At the end of the first phase of qualifying, Daniel Colembie went off the track and heavily damaged his BMW M4. His JR Motorsports teammate Simas Juodviršis also crashed, this time in top 10 shootout. Team was unable to rebuild both cars before the race, therefore Daniel Colembie and his co-drivers Michael Verhagen and Ward Sluys withdrawn from the race.

Some drivers were unable to improve their lap time due to crash of Simas Juodviršis, as qualification was cancelled early. Defending race winners, Liqui Moly Racing Team Lithuania, did not advance to top 10 shootout: Kazimieras Vasiliauskas qualified in 12th position.

Qualification: Top 10 shootout results

Race
Jeroen Bleekemolen led early stages of the race, as Jonas Gelžinis and Robertas Kupčikas closely followed him in second and third. Ramūnas Čapkauskas retired from the race after only 50 laps due electronic failure of his Aquila CR1 prototype. 70 laps into the race unexpected heavy rain caught many fast drivers, including Dainius Matijošaitis with BMW M4, Edvinas Arkušauskas with BMW E90 EDVA, Marius Steponavičius with BMW M3 GT2 and Arūnas Mrazauskas with Lexus IS-F, who crashed heavily. Only Mrazauskas was able to continue the race after lengthy repairs in pitlane, as all other drivers retired. Due to crashes, safety car was deployed several times.

Rain stopped only 100 laps later. As the race track began to dry, two race-leading Porsches took a gamble and pitted for slick tyres. However, the risk didn't paid off as the rain started to fall again. Both cars stayed on track on slick tyres as Jeroen Bleekemolen and Ignas Gelžinis hoped that the rain will stop soon. However, this was a crucial mistake for Bleekemolen, who missed a breaking point on the wet track and crashed into the barriers. He managed to return to pitlane for repairs, but lost 14 laps and the race lead in the process.

Battle for the lead continued between Juta-KG Group and Balpol-15min powered by Oktanas Racing, as the two teams were separated by only a few seconds during majority of the second part of the race. However, 30 laps until the end of the race Nerijus Dagilis ran out of fuel and was forced to stop at the track. His Porsche was pulled back to pitlane, but after this mistake his team lost 6 laps and all chances to win a race. That left Ignas Gelžinis comfortably in front. For the final stint he handed the car over to Tautvydas Barštys, who easily crossed the finish line in first place. This was first win for Tautvydas Barštys in 1000 kilometrų lenktynės, second win for Ignas Gelžinis, and a record-breaking fifth win for Jonas Gelžinis.

Former Formula 1 drover Michael Bleekemolen and his co-driver Rene Steenmetz was running fifth as the race was coming to an end. However, after mechanical problems with his Renault Clio he was forced to retire from the race when only six laps were remaining. In the process, he dropped to sixth place, as all other drivers were six laps behind.

Race results
Class winners in bold.

References

ENEOS 1000 kilometrų lenktynės
ENEOS 1000 kilometrų lenktynės